Bobrisky is a Nigerian transgender woman and LGBT personality. She is also known for her presence on the social media apps Snapchat, TikTok and Instagram. She has gone viral on TikTok for creating the "bobrisky dance" in 2021.

Early life and education 
Born Okuneye Idris Olarenwaju in 1991, Bobrisky attended both King's High School, Lagos and Okota High School, Lagos for her secondary school education, and studied and graduated with a BSc Accounting from the University of Lagos (UNILAG), Nigeria.

Exposure 
She became recognized as being highly controversial on social media for not adhering to conservative Nigerian standards. Bobrisky has a huge following on social media. She was able to garner traffic to her Snapchat account when she claimed she had a lover who is assumed to be of masculine gender despite the law in Nigeria stating that same sex relationships is an offence punishable by up to 14 years imprisonment. On 8 July 2021, she revealed a new physical appearance after undergoing surgery to become more feminine. She has also advised upcoming transgender individuals to go for proper surgical enhancement procedures so they can be who they truly want to be.

Reaction
Bobrisky has been asked by certain event planners to give talks at events.  A Nigerian presidential aide walked out of a premises on sighting Bobrisky within the residence. In 2019, Otunba Olusegun Runsewe, Director General of Nigeria's National Council for Arts and Culture, called Bobrisky "a national disgrace" and said she would be "dealt with ruthlessly" if caught on the streets.

Influence
Taiwo Kola-Ogunlade, Google's Communications and Public Affairs Manager for West Africa, said Bobrisky was the most searched individual in Nigeria from 26 October to November 2016. Bobrisky has also been associated with other Nigerian celebrities such as Tonto Dikeh.

References 

1992 births
Nigerian entertainment industry businesspeople
Living people
Nigerian transgender people
University of Lagos alumni
King's College, Lagos alumni
Transgender women
21st-century Nigerian LGBT people